Shahin Tappeh (also Romanized as Shāhīn Tappeh; also known as Shān Tappeh, Shantepe, and Shan-Teppe) is a village in Dashtabi-ye Sharqi Rural District, Dashtabi District, Buin Zahra County, Qazvin Province, Iran. At the 2006 census, its population was 2,402, in 476 families.

References 

Populated places in Buin Zahra County